Gavan Holohan (born 15 December 1991) is an Irish professional footballer who plays for EFL League Two club Grimsby Town.

Beginning his career as a youngster with Hull City, Holohan returned to his native Ireland where he featured for League of Ireland sides Drogheda United, Cork City, Galway United and Waterford. He joined Hartlepool United in 2019 and in 2021 he was part of their side that won promotion back to the Football League. He repeated the success the following season with Grimsby Town.

History

Hull City
Holohan came through the ranks with Kilkenny City in his native Ireland and was picked up by Hull City in 2008. He went on to spend the next four years with the Tigers but failed to make an appearance, only making the bench once for an FA Cup tie against Wigan Athletic.

Alfreton Town
Holohan was signed by Alfreton Town in 2012 following his release from Hull. He also trialled with Carlisle United and Hibernian.

Drogheda United
After being released by Alfreton, Holohan signed for League of Ireland side Drogheda United. Holohan enjoyed a successful campaign in the 2014 season, scoring 8 goals in 32 games and winning the supporters' player of the year award. He helped Drogheda progress to the quarter-finals of the FAI Cup by scoring 3 goals in 3 games but was one of three Drogheda players sent off in their exit against the eventual champions Derry City.

Cork City
In November 2014, Holohan left to sign for Cork City. During his two years at Cork, Holohan won the FAI Cup in 2016 and scored in the President of Ireland's Cup final to help his side win 2–0.

Galway United
Holohan later joined Galway United and scored his first career hat trick in a 4–1 win over his former side Drogheda United.

Waterford
After suffering relegation with Galway United, Holohan signed for Waterford following their promotion to the top flight. He helped the club finish fourth and while this would have qualified the club for the Europa League first qualifying round, Waterford were ruled by UEFA to have not passed the "three-year rule" as the club were reformed in 2016.

Hartlepool United
Holohan signed with English National League club Hartlepool United on a short-term contract in 2019. Having had to wait for international clearance before being able to play, Holohan eventually broke into the first team and scored his first goal in English football in a 1–1 draw against Aldershot Town in April 2019, an equaliser which ultimately relegated his opponents. Holohan impressed in the seven games that he played and did enough to earn an extended contract.

In the 2019–20 season, Holohan scored nine goals and contributed seven assists. Holohan then signed a contract until the end of the 2021–22 season due to this good form.

Holohan scored his 10th goal of the 2020–21 season in a 2–0 win against Notts County. This goal was also his fourth consecutive goal after scoring against Stockport County, Dagenham & Redbridge, Boreham Wood, and Notts County respectively. He was awarded the League's Player of the Month award for April 2021. Holohan started in the 2021 National League play-off Final as Hartlepool were promoted back to the Football League.

In August 2021, Holohan scored Hartlepool's first goal back in the Football League in a 1–0 victory over Crawley Town. In a 2–1 win over rivals Carlisle United, Holohan scored his final goal for Hartlepool. This would subsequently be voted as League Two goal of the month for August. Holohan struggled for game time during the 2021–22 season and departed after making 108 appearances and scoring 23 times.

Grimsby Town
On 22 March 2022, Holohan signed a two-year deal with National League side Grimsby Town. On 23 May 2022, with Grimsby trailing 1-0 to Notts County in the National League play-offs in the final minute of added on time, Holohan scored an equaliser to send the game to extra time, with Grimsby going on to win the game 2-1 and advancing to the semi-finals.

Holohan played in the 2022 National League play-off Final as Grimsby beat Solihull Moors 2–1 at the London Stadium to return to the Football League. During an FA Cup fourth round tie at Championship side Luton Town, Holohan scored the opening goal in a 2–2 draw. 

On 1 March 2023, he scored two penalties in a 2–1 victory at Premier League side Southampton in the fifth round of the FA Cup, securing Grimsby's first quarter-final appearance since 1939.

Career statistics

Honours
Cork City
FAI Cup: 2016

Hartlepool United
National League play-offs: 2021

Grimsby Town
National League play-offs: 2022

Individual
Drogheda United Supporters' Player of the Year: 2014
National League Player of the Month: April 2021

References

1991 births
Living people
Republic of Ireland association footballers
Association football midfielders
Alfreton Town F.C. players
Drogheda United F.C. players
Cork City F.C. players
Galway United F.C. players
Waterford F.C. players
Hartlepool United F.C. players
Grimsby Town F.C. players
League of Ireland players
National League (English football) players
Republic of Ireland expatriate association footballers
Expatriate footballers in England
Irish expatriate sportspeople in England
English Football League players